Andrew James Swan  (born August 9, 1968) is a politician in Manitoba, Canada. He served in the Legislative Assembly of Manitoba from 2004 to 2019. He was first elected in a 2004 by-election, replacing MaryAnn Mihychuk, who resigned to run for Mayor of Winnipeg.

Swan graduated from the University of Manitoba faculty of law in 1990. After graduating, he practised law at the firm of Thompson Dorfman Sweatman, becoming a partner in 2000. His specialty was family law. Swan was appointed to the Residential Tenancies Commission in 2000, and is also a member of the Manitoba Running Association.

Swan first ran for the Manitoba legislature as a New Democrat in the 1990 provincial election, placing third in the west-end Winnipeg riding of Sturgeon Creek. He did not run again until 2004.

On June 22, 2004, Swan was elected as a New Democrat for the riding of Minto, defeating Liberal Wayne Helgason, 2848 votes to 1616. He was re-elected in the 2007 provincial election. He was appointed to cabinet on February 4, 2008, as Minister of Competitiveness, Training and Trade, Minister charged with the administration of the Liquor Control Act, and Minister charged with the administration of The Manitoba Lotteries Corporation Act.

On September 2, 2009, after Premier Gary Doer resigned from the Assembly to become Ambassador to the United States, Swan resigned his cabinet position and announced his candidacy for the leadership of the New Democratic Party of Manitoba, running against Steve Ashton and Greg Selinger. Nancy Allan replaced Swan as interim Minister of Competitiveness, Training and Trade. The leadership convention took place on October 17, 2009. On September 28, Swan dropped out of the leadership race and endorsed Selinger. He regained his ministerial positions on October 5, 2009.

After winning the leadership race, Selinger appointed Swan as Minister of Justice and Attorney General on November 3.

Swan resigned his cabinet position on November 3, 2014, along with Jennifer Howard, Theresa Oswald, Erin Selby and Stan Struthers, due to concerns about Premier Selinger's leadership.
 He remained an NDP MLA after resignation.

On January 20, 2019, Swan announced he would be seeking the federal NDP nomination in the riding of Winnipeg Centre in the 2019 Canadian federal election. He lost the May 31, 2019, nomination vote to community activist Leah Gazan. He did not seek re-election in the snap 2019 Manitoba general election, in which Minto was eliminated by electoral redistribution the previous winter.

References

1968 births
Living people
Members of the Executive Council of Manitoba
New Democratic Party of Manitoba MLAs
Politicians from Winnipeg
University of Manitoba alumni
Robson Hall alumni
21st-century Canadian politicians